A flaming sword is a sword which is glowing with a flame which is produced by some supernatural power. Flaming swords have existed in legends and myths for thousands of years.

Abrahamic sources 

According to the Bible, a flaming sword ( lahat chereb or literally "flame of the whirling sword"  lahaṭ haḥereb hammithappeket) was entrusted to the cherubim by God to guard the gates of Paradise after Adam and Eve were banished (Genesis 3:24). Scholars have variously interpreted the sword as a weapon of the cherubim, as lightning, as a metaphor, as an independent divine being, or even as a figurative description of bladed chariot wheels.

In Kabbalah, the flaming sword represents the order which the sefirot were created in, also known as “the path of the flaming sword.”

Eastern Orthodox tradition says that after Jesus was crucified and resurrected, the flaming sword was removed from the Garden of Eden, making it possible for humanity to re-enter Paradise.

Dumah is an angel mentioned in Rabbinical literature and popular in Yiddish folklore. Isaac Bashevis Singer's Short Friday (1964), a collection of stories, mentions Dumah as a "thousand-eyed angel of death, armed with a flaming sword". The sword is otherwise associated with various angels, such as the archangel Uriel, Camael or Jophiel.

Gnosticism 
The ancient Gnostic codex On the Origin of the World predicts that the kings under the archons will be drunken from the flaming sword during the end times.

Germanic mythology 
In Norse mythology, the weapon wielded by the giant Surtr is referred to as a "flaming sword" by Snorri Sturluson in Gylfaginning 4,  of the Prose Edda. Snorri immediately afterwards quotes a stanza from his poetic source, (Völuspá 52), where it is stated that Surt has fire with him, and that his sword shines with the "sun of the gods of the slain". However, it has been argued that the poem might be stressing the fiery glare of Surtr himself more than the sword. The relevant kenning from the quoted poem, svigi lævi ("destruction of twigs"), is usually interpreted to mean "fire". However, Henrik Schück interpreted the kenning as referring to a sword, emending the phrase to svigi læva to identify it with the sword Lævateinn in Fjölsvinnsmál. Snorri paraphrases the strophe of the poem a second time in Gylfaginning 51, merely saying: "Surt rides first, and before him and after him is burning fire",, afterwards requoting more extensively around the same strophe (Völuspá 48–56). The possibility that this sword imagery was inspired by Christian writings have been speculated.

Celtic legend 
According to the Welsh triads, the Dyrnwyn ('White-Hilt'), one of the Thirteen Treasures of the Island of Britain, is said to be a powerful sword belonging to Rhydderch Hael, one of the Three Generous Men of Britain. When drawn by a worthy or well-born man, the entire blade would blaze with fire. Rhydderch was never reluctant to hand the weapon to anyone, hence his nickname; Hael (the Generous), but as soon as the recipients learned of its peculiar properties, they always rejected the sword.

Hindu and Buddhist (Dharmic) sources 

In Hinduism, Kalki (Sanskrit: कल्कि) also called Kalkin or karki, is the prophesied tenth and final incarnation of Hindu God Vishnu to end the Kali Yuga, one of the four periods in the endless cycle of existence (Krita) in Vaishnavism cosmology. The end of Kali Yuga states this will usher in the new epoch of Satya Yuga in the cycle of existence, until the MahaPralaya (the Great Dissolution of the Universe).
Kalki is described in the Puranas as the avatar who rejuvenates existence by ending the darkest and destructive period to remove adharma and ushering in the Satya Yuga, while riding a white horse with a fiery sword. The description and details of Kalki are different among various Puranas.

See also
 Flame-bladed sword
 Flaming sword (effect)
 Lightsaber
 Magic sword

Explanatory notes

References
Citations

Bibliography

 
 
 
 
 
 
 

Fire in religion
Mythological swords
Garden of Eden